Jason Robertson (born 17 November 1994) is a Zimbabwean-born New Zealand rugby union player, currently playing for Narbonne. His preferred position is fly-half.

Professional career
Robertson signed for Major League Rugby side Old Glory DC ahead of the 2020 Major League Rugby season, and re-signed ahead of the 2021 Major League Rugby season. In 2020 he joined  for the 2020 Mitre 10 Cup. After the end of the 2021 season, he signed with French club Narbonne, which was recently promoted to Pro D2.

References

External links
itsrugby.co.uk Profile

1994 births
Living people
New Zealand rugby union players
Rugby union fly-halves
Waikato rugby union players
Bay of Plenty rugby union players
Old Glory DC players
Counties Manukau rugby union players
RC Narbonne players